Mount Ewart is an ice-free mountain rising to  at the northwest side of Lake Cole and  west of Mount Melania, Black Island, in the Ross Archipelago. It was named by the  Advisory Committee on Antarctic Names (1999) after A. Ewart of the New Zealand Geological Survey, Lower Hutt, who, with J.W. Cole, investigated the geology of Brown Peninsula, Black Island, and Cape Bird in the 1964–65 season.

References 

Mountains of the Ross Dependency
Black Island (Ross Archipelago)